The following is a list of speakers of the Parliament of Somalia. There have been 12 official speakers of the Parliament since the office was created in 1956 . The first Speaker of the Parliament was Aden Abdulle Osman, who served prior to independence in the Trust Territory of Somalia, Succeeded by Hagi Bashir Ismail Yusuf on July 1, 1960 Somali National Assembly. The incumbent Speaker of the Federal Parliament of Somalia is Sheikh Aden Madobe.

Acting President
In the event of a temporary absence of the President of Somalia on account of illness, travel abroad or similar circumstances, the speaker of the parliament serves as acting president, and exercises the powers of the state president until the president resumes his functions, and in the event that the presidency falls vacant as a result of death or resignation or for any other reason, until the election of a new president.

List of speakers

New incumbent speaker of Somalia 

Adan Muhammad Nur is the incumbent speaker of Somalia. He assumed his office on April 28, 2022. He received the majority of votes in the parliament where he won all the three rounds. Since his elections he has chaired various committees.

See also
List of Members of the Federal Parliament of Somalia

References

Various editions of The Europa World Year

External links
Federal Parliament of Somalia - Members

Parliament, Speakers
Somalia, Parliament